CORONA is a single-stage-to-orbit launch vehicle capable of performing vertical takeoff and landing. It was developed by OAO GRTs Makeyev from 1992 to 2012. However, the development was declined due to lack of funding. In 2016, the company announced plans to resume the development of the CORONA vehicle.

Overview

See also 
 Lockheed Martin X-33
 Blue Origin New Shepard
 Quad (rocket)
 Zarya
 SpaceX reusable launch system development program
 McDonnell Douglas DC-X
 Project Morpheus NASA program to continue developing ALHAT and Quad landers
 Reusable Vehicle Testing
 Kankoh-maru

References 

 New in the development of rocket and space systems: single-stage reusable rocket "CROWN" // Aerospace Technology. Scientific and technical collection. Issue 1 (43) Part 2 / holes. YP Panov, editor EA Osipova. - Miass: SRC "Design Bureau. Academician VP Makeyev ", 1999. - S. 181 - 209. - (XIV). - 400 copies.
 On the possible ways of development of reusable space transportation systems (MTX) // Aerospace Technology. Scientific and technical collection. Issue 1 (48) Part II / holes. OD Parkhomenko, EA Editor Osipova. - Miass: SRC "Design Bureau. Academician VP Makeyev ", 2002. - S. 120 - 340. - (XIV). - 300 copies.
 Anton Pervushin. Chapter 15. Heirs "Buran". The "cold" // The battle for the stars. Part II. The cosmic confrontation. - Moscow: OOO "Publishing ACT», 2004. - 831 p.. - 5000 copies -. .
 Kosmodem'yanskii AA Konstantin Tsiolkovsky. - 2nd supplemented. - M:. Science, 1987. - 304 p. - 80,000 copies.

External links 

Single-stage-to-orbit
Former proposed space launch system concepts
VTVL rockets
Makeyev Rocket Design Bureau